Molapowabojang is a village in the Southern District of Botswana, Located between Lobatse and Kanye, about 15 km North-West of Lobatse. With a population of about 7,520 (2011 Census). This village falls under an administration of the Southern District Council which is headquartered in Kanye.

History

Molapowabojang is just shy of its 100th year, found in 1914. The village is 'Multi-cultural' as it has people from all over Botswana but has most of its inhabitants are from the Southern District/Ngwaketse District. It is believed that the Matabele tribe once inhabited the place and used it as a harbor during the Mzilikazi Kingdom. This is evidenced by the foot prints and butt prints that are visible in some rocks of Motsenekatse Hill and the name Motsenekatse has also been derived from "Mzilikazi".

Geography

Molapowabojang is built along the river, hence the name Molapowabojang which means "Rivergrass". This river runs almost around the village and it is believed that it used to supply the village with fresh water before they had clean drinking water supply. There are also several hills in the village, Motsenekatse which is the largest, Chichi Hill, Ntomalome and several other smaller hills.

Education

Molapowabojang has two Primary schools, the oldest being Molapowabojang and Pitsonyane  being the newer primary, about 14 years old. In addition to these primary schools, there is a Community Junior Secondary School, Chichi Hill and Maraka Community junior secondary school, named after the hill due to its proximity to the hill. Chichi Hill CJSS caters for both primary schools in Molapowabojang as well as other surrounding villages like Kgomokasitwa, Maisane, etc.

Shopping and entertainment

Bashanka Enterprises is one of the oldest Lucky 7 stores in Molapowabojang, followed by Moonyana, Ga Bushi, Square Deal and Value Stores "Choppies". There is a lot of night entertainment which includes bars and a Recreational Prak, Molapowabojang RecPark which sees a lot of local musicians as well as South African musicians every year. The RecPark is one of the well known entertainment centers across Botswana among the night crawlers, especially the youth.

Developments

Molapowabojang residents have been struggling with their water supply, they could go for days without water as they were being supplied by the water trucks which had to fill up the supply tank. Recently Molapowabojang water supply has been connected to the Lobatse pipe lines to provide a steady water supply for the village. There is also a Geographical Survey (GS) building just opposite Bashanka Enterprises which has its headquarters in Lobatse. There is also a newly built motel in the village, just close to the RecPark. The motel serves both the local residents as well as tourists and other people coming from outside the village either passing by or staying for entertainment purposes.

See also
Sub-districts of Botswana

External links 
 Facebook Group

Villages in Botswana
Southern District (Botswana)
Populated places established in 1914
1914 establishments in Africa